Gregor Židan (born 5 October 1965) is a Slovenian retired football midfielder and a politician.

International career
Židan first represented Croatia, playing one unofficial friendly match against the United States on 17 October 1990, coming on as a 71st-minute substitute for Saša Peršon.

He then was capped 19 times for Slovenia between 1992 and 1996, his final international was an April 1996 World Cup qualification match away against Greece.

References

External links
 
Gregor Židan at PrvaLiga 

1965 births
Living people
Footballers from Ljubljana
Slovenian people of Croatian descent
Association football midfielders
Yugoslav footballers
Croatian footballers
Croatia international footballers
Slovenian footballers
Slovenia international footballers
Dual internationalists (football)
NK Olimpija Ljubljana (1945–2005) players
GNK Dinamo Zagreb players
NK Maribor players
NK Ivančna Gorica players
Croatian Football League players
Slovenian PrvaLiga players
Slovenian Second League players
Slovenian sportsperson-politicians
Modern Centre Party politicians
Social Democrats (Slovenia) politicians
Members of the National Assembly (Slovenia)